James Orr (1770 – 24 April 1816), known as the Bard of Ballycarry, was a poet or rhyming weaver from Ballycarry, Co. Antrim in the province of Ulster in Ireland, who wrote in English and Ulster Scots. His most famous poem was The Irishman. He was the foremost of the Ulster Weaver Poets, and was writing contemporaneously with Robert Burns. 

Orr joined the Irish nationalist Society of United Irishmen in 1791 and took part in the Irish Rebellion of 1798. The United Army of Ulster, of which he was a part, was defeated at the Battle of Antrim and after a time hiding from the authorities, he fled to America. He remained there for a short time, earning a living by working for a newspaper, but returned to Ballycarry in 1802 under an amnesty. He died in Ballycarry in 1816 at the age of 46. Orr had supported the Haitian Revolution and write a poem 'Toussaint's Farewell to St Domingo" about it.

An imposing monument to Orr, erected by local Freemasons in 1831, is sited in the Templecorran cemetery near Ballycarry, in memory of the great Mason and Ulster Weaver Poet. Orr had been a charter member of the Lodge.

The version of the Irish passport issued in 2013 has lines of poetry in Irish, English and Ulster Scots. The Ulster Scots lines are from Orr's poem Written in Winter and appear on page 28 of the document.

Poems 

James Orr (1770–1816) writes from his experience of the story of the exiles from Ballycarry after the ill-fated 1798 Rebellion.

The Passengers

See also
List of Irish writers

References

External links
SEARC's webguide
Larne Borough Council
Article on James Orr
Irish Freemasons

1770 births
1816 deaths
18th-century Irish poets
19th-century Irish poets
Irish Freemasons
People from County Antrim
Ulster Scots people
United Irishmen
Ulster Weaver Poets
Ulster Scots-language poets